The 2019 Summer Universiade, officially known as the XXX Summer Universiade and also known as Napoli 2019, was held in Naples, Italy, between 3 and 14 July 2019.

It was initially scheduled for Brasília, Brazil in July 2019. However, on 23 December 2014, it was confirmed that Brasília had withdrawn from hosting the event, citing financial problems. International University Sports Federation decided to reopen the bidding process after the withdrawal.

Host selection
On 14 June 2012, the then-Brazilian Minister of Sports, Aldo Rebelo, and the president of CBDU (Confederação Brasileira do Desporto Universitário), Luciano Cabral, announced that after the failed bid by Brazil for the 2017 Summer Universiade, they would bid again for the 2019 Summer Universiade. Brazil's capital Brasília was appointed as the bid city again after it lost in 2017 to Taipei. Brazil previously hosted the Summer Universiade once in 1963 in Porto Alegre.

On 11 December 2012, Azad Rahimov, the Youth and Sports Minister of Azerbaijan, announced that after the country won the rights to host the first European Games in 2015, they would bid to host the 2019 Summer Universiade. The attempt was the first time that Azerbaijan placed a bid for the Universiade. Baku would represent the country as the bid city.

On 31 January 2013, Miklós Tóth, the vice-chairman of the Hungarian Olympic Committee, announced that Hungary would make a bid for the 2019 or 2021 Summer Universiade with the aid of Alfréd Hajós' Plan (Hajós Alfréd Terv). Budapest previously hosted the 1965 Summer Universiade and was confirmed as the bid city on 19 February 2013.

On 3 April 2013, FISU officially confirmed three candidate cities:
  Baku, Azerbaijan
  Brasilia, Brazil
  Budapest, Hungary

On 31 October 2013, Baku officially withdrew from the bidding process for the 2019 Summer Universiade, citing that the city will be busy with other sporting events in the period of 2015–2017 with the 2015 European Games and the 2017 Islamic Solidarity Games. On 8 November 2013, Budapest withdrew because the city could not afford the costs of the event, leaving Brasilia as the only bidding city. On 9 November 2013, FISU nominated Brasilia as host city of the 2019 Summer Universiade. On 5 March 2016, FISU reattributed the 2019 Universiade to Naples, Italy.

Venues
The Organising committee plans to involve already existed sports facilities after their renovation.
Naples venues
Stadio San Paolo – ceremonies  and athletics
PalaVesuvio – Artistic gymnastics and Rhythmic gymnastics
PalaBarbuto – Basketball
Mostra d'Oltremare – Diving, Judo and Shooting sports
Ex Born – Rugby sevens
Circolo del Remo and Vela Italia – Sailing
Felice Scandone pool – Swimming
Tennis and Caracciolo boardwalk – Tennis

Avellino venues
Stadio Partenio-Adriano Lombardi – Archery
Palasport Del Mauro – Basketball

Baronissi venues
University Sports Center CUS Salerno – Fencing

Caserta venues
Royal Palace of Caserta – Archery
Stadio Alberto Pinto – Football
Swimming Stadium – Swimming

Eboli venues
PalaSele – Volleyball

Opening ceremony

The opening ceremony was held at Stadio San Paolo and ran from 21:00 to 00:20 Central European Summer Time including a special performance by Italian tenor Andrea Bocelli.

Marketing

Logo
The logo of the games was an image of Mount Vesuvius, a somma-stratovolcano located on the Gulf of Naples which was remodeled into five chromatic trails of both the Olympics and Universiade that resembles a race track. The lines meeting at the top and ending with a puff of multicoloured smoke symbolise different people’s involvement with a unique objective of sharing and contributing to development, progress, solidarity, and coexistence.

Mascot
The mascot of the games was a Siren named "Partenope", which was designed by Melania Acanfora, young Neapolitan student of the “Accademia delle Belle Arti” (Academy of Fine Arts). The Mascot is described as a gymnast with her fish tail that could be transformed into scaly legs which allow her to run, jump, dance, just as a real athlete. In the opening ceremony, Mariafelicia Carraturo interpreted the mascot.

Sports

 Aquatics
 
 
 
 
 
 
 
 
 
 Artistic gymnastics (14)
 Rhythmic gymnastics (8)

Participants
in order of appearance,  Parade of Nations:

Schedule

Closing ceremony
The closing ceremony was held on 14 July 2019 at the Stadio San Paolo and ran from 21:00 to 23:20 Central European Summer Time. The closing ceremony featuring the handover of the FISU flag to the Chinese city of Chengdu as the host city of the 2021 Summer Universiade. Along with the FISU, protocol the ceremony had the performances by rapper Clementino, singer and Eurovision Song Contest 2019 runner-up Mahmood and Austrian DJ Sonic Snares.

Medal table

References

External links
Universiade Naples 2019

 
2019
International sports competitions hosted by Italy
Sports competitions in Naples
Multi-sport events in Italy
Universiade Summer
Universiade Summer
21st century in Naples
July 2019 sports events in Italy